Rusidava (or Zusidava) was a Dacian town mentioned in Tabula Peutingeriana between Acidava and Pons Aluti, today's Drăgășani, Vâlcea County, Romania.

See also 
 Dacian davae
 List of ancient cities in Thrace and Dacia
 Dacia
 Roman Dacia

References

Ancient

Modern 

 

Dacian towns